Eastern New England English, historically known as the Yankee dialect since at least the 19th century, is the traditional regional dialect of Maine, New Hampshire, and the eastern half of Massachusetts. Features of this variety once spanned an even larger dialect area of New England, for example, including the eastern halves of Vermont and Connecticut for those born as late as the early twentieth century. Studies vary as to whether the unique dialect of Rhode Island technically falls within the Eastern New England dialect region.

Eastern New England English, here including Rhode Island English, is classically associated with sound patterns such as: non-rhoticity, or dropping r when not before a vowel; both variants of Canadian raising, including a fairly back starting position of the  vowel (as in ); and some variation of the  vowel distinctions, the marry–merry distinction, or both. Eastern New England (excluding Rhode Island) is also nationally recognized for its highly front  vowel. 

As of the 21st century, certain traditional characteristics are declining due to many younger Eastern New Englanders avoiding them, particularly non-rhoticity and the aforementioned vowel distinctions, which they tend to perceive as old-fashioned, overly rural-sounding, or even overly urban-sounding with regard to Boston. New Hampshire speakers on the whole are particularly well documented as retreating from these older Eastern New England features since the mid-20th century onwards.

Overview of phonology
The sound system of traditional Eastern New England English includes:
Non-rhoticity: The r sound may be "dropped" or "silent" if not before a vowel; therefore, in words like car, letter, horse, poor, etc. The feature is retreating and is not found in many younger speakers, for example, in virtually no speakers born since the mid-20th century in southeastern New Hampshire.
Linking and intrusive r: The non-rhotic r may be pronounced after all if it is followed by a vowel, even a vowel that begins the next word in the sentence. Also, any word that ends in /ə/ (as in Cuba), /ɑ/ (as in spa), or /ɔ/ (as in law) can be followed by an unwritten r sound when followed by a vowel sound in the next word: thus, law and public safety sounds like Lauren public safety.
Backing of : The vowel of goose, rude, coup, etc. remains pronounced relatively far back in the mouth.
Possible lack of the horse–hoarse merger: The vowel of words like war versus wore, or morning versus mourning, are mostly produced either very close or the same in Eastern New England; however, as of the early 2000s, such vowels may still be pronounced differently by some Eastern New England speakers, especially in Maine. Conversely, the merger of the vowels is largely complete elsewhere in the United States.
Full Canadian raising: The tongue is raised in the first element of the gliding vowel  as well as  whenever either appears before a voiceless consonant. Therefore, a word like house  is often .
Backing of : The vowel of gouge, loud, town, power, etc. has a relatively back-of-mouth starting position: thus, something like .
However, recent studies have shown that there is an emerging tendency in Northeastern New England (Boston, for example) to merge them, as in most other American accents.
"Short a" nasal system: The "short a" sound  may be tensed in various environments, though most severely before a nasal consonant; therefore, in words like man, clam, Annie, etc.
Fronting of /: The vowel of words like palm, spa, car, park, etc. is pronounced farther to the front of the vocal tract than in most other dialects, so that car, for example, is something like . This, plus non-rhoticity, is often associated with the shibboleth "Park the car in Harvard yard." This fronting is seldom reported in Rhode Island, in which car is more often backed .
The weak vowel merger is traditionally absent. This makes Lenin  distinct from Lennon .

Overview of vocabulary and grammatical features

Some words or phrases most famously or strongly associated with Eastern New England are:
bang: to make a sudden or decisive turn while driving; only used in certain phrases: "bang a left", "bang a right", or "bang a U-ie".
bubbler or water bubbler: drinking fountain. This term is also used in Wisconsin and Australia.
bulkie: a thick white-bread roll, similar to a hamburger bun or kaiser roll
frappe : a thick beverage made of milk and ice cream, i.e. a milkshake in most other places (whereas "milkshake" in Boston traditionally means flavored milk). A synonym common only in Rhode Island is cabinet.
hoodsie: a small disposable cup of ice cream, the kind that comes with a flat wooden spoon (from HP Hood, the dairy that sells them and elsewhere sometimes known as a "dixie cup".) A secondary meaning (very offensive slang) is "promiscuous teenaged girl".
jimmies: sprinkles; to some, particularly chocolate sprinkles. The term is also common in the Philadelphia area.
pissa(h): "great" or "amazing", either realistically or sarcastically. This is from the word "pisser" with a Boston accent, but used as an adjective. Occasionally combined with "wicked" to yield "wicked pissah".
scrod: any small whitefish, such as cod or haddock, used in cooking
"So don't I": "so do I" or "I do too". 
spa: a neighborhood convenience store that has a soda fountain and often sells sandwiches.
tonic : any sweet, carbonated soft drink (chiefly confined to Boston), otherwise known as "soda" in the region or "pop" elsewhere; not the same as tonic water.
whiffle: a crew cut or male haircut done with electric clippers.
wicked: "very" or "super", used as an adverb or intensifier (such as "That hockey game was wicked good!" or "Ugh, that guy is wicked slow").
Many words common to Boston are also common throughout New England dialects: grinder for "submarine sandwich" (also, spuckie or spuky in East Boston), packie (or package store) for "liquor store", rotary for "traffic circle" (these full-speed circular intersections being common in Greater Boston), and yous as the working-class plural form of "you" (a word found throughout the urban Northeast with many spelling variants). Cellar, whose definition may have slight nuances nationwide, can also be a simple synonym for basement in Eastern New England and Massachusetts generally. In this same area, related expressions like down the cellar or even down-cellar are distinctive, meaning "down to the basement" or "down in the basement" (as in "She's getting some boxes down-cellar").

Northeastern New England English

Boston

Boston, Massachusetts is the birthplace and most famous site of Eastern New England English. Historically, a Northeastern type of New England English spread from metropolitan Boston into metropolitan Worcester, the bulk of New Hampshire, and central and coastal Maine. Boston speech also originated many slang and uniquely local terms that have since spread throughout Massachusetts and Eastern New England. Although mostly non-rhotic, the modern Boston accent typically pronounces the r sound in the  vowel, as in bird, learn, turkey, world, etc.

Maine

Maine is one of the last American regions to resist the horse–hoarse merger. This continued resistance was verified by some speakers in a 2006 study of Bangor and Portland, Maine, yet contradicted by a 2013 study that reported the merger as embraced by Portland speakers "of all ages". The horse–hoarse separation means that words like war and wore may sound different: war  rhyming with law , and wore  rhyming with boa .

Cultivated New England
A cultivated New England accent, sometimes known as a "Boston Brahmin accent" within Boston, was once associated with members of wealthy New England families in the late 19th and early 20th centuries; it is now essentially extinct. Notable example speakers included many members of the Kennedy family born in this time period, including President John F. Kennedy, whose accent is not an ordinary Boston accent so much as a "tony Harvard accent". This accent retained an older cot–caught distinction, a less fronted  vowel in some speakers, non-rhotic , and a  split ( versus ). This accent corresponds in its time-frame and in much of its sound with a cultivated transatlantic accent promoted in prestigious northeastern boarding schools and theatrical elocution courses in the same era.

Notable speakers of Northeastern New England English
 Ken Beatrice – "... the New England native with the pronounced Boston accent"
 Bill Burr — "the comic's wicked Boston accent"
 Calvin Coolidge – "r-less New Englander"
 Lenny Clarke – "a Cambridge-raised verbal machine gun with a raspy Boston accent"
 Nick Di Paolo – "thick Boston accent"
John F. Kennedy – "his tony Harvard accent"
 Edward "Ted" Kennedy – "No one else from Boston, or anywhere in New England, has imprinted the regional accent on the national consciousness as Senator Kennedy did."
 Mel King – "he has the soft Rs of a deep Boston accent"
 Lyndon LaRouche – "a cultivated New England accent"
 Christy Mihos – "speaks unpretentiously in a variation of a Boston accent, and drops the 'g' in words like talking or running."
 Brian and Jim Moran – "The Moran brothers share an unmistakable Massachusetts accent"
 Tom Silva – "New England accent"
 Jermaine Wiggins – "skin as thick as his East Boston accent"

Rhode Island English

The traditional English-language accent of Southeastern New England, popularly known as a Rhode Island accent, is spoken in Rhode Island and the western half of Bristol County, Massachusetts. These features are often unlike the modern Northeastern New England (NENE) dialect of Boston, as is Rhode Island's feature of a completed father–bother merger, shared with the rest of the country outside of NENE. A few terms are unique only to this area, such as the word cabinet to mean "milkshake" (particularly, coffee cabinets), pizza strips (Italian tomato pie strips served cold without cheese), and coffee milk.

Notable lifelong native speakers
John Chafee – a non-rhotic "New England accent"
Emeril Lagasse
"Pauly D" DelVecchio – "the thickest Rhode Island accent"
Henry Giroux
Spalding Gray – "his demeanor is as flat as his Rhode Island accent"
Chris Herren – "with a Fall River accent he bellows"
John Pastore
Daniel McKee – governor of Rhode Island

French-American Manchester English
An ethnic local accent has been documented among self-identifying French Americans in Manchester, New Hampshire. The accent's most prominent pronunciation features are th-stopping (pronouncing thin like tin and there like dare) and, variably, word-initial h-dropping (so that hair may sound like air).

See also
Accent (sociolinguistics)
Boston accent
Maine accent
Western New England English

Notes

References

 
 
 Stanford, James N.; Leddy-Cecere, Thomas A.; Baclawski Jr., Kenneth P. "Farewell To The Founders: Major Dialect Changes Along The East-West New England Border." American Speech 87.2 (2012): pp. 126–169. Communication & Mass Media Complete. Web. 2 Nov. 2015.
Stanford, James N.; Severance, Nathan A.; Baclawski Jr., Kenneth P. "Multiple vectors of unidirectional dialect change in eastern New England." Language Variation and Change (2014) Vol.26 (1), pp. 103–140.
 Stanford, James. 2019. New England English: Large-scale acoustic sociophonetics and dialectology. Oxford University Press. 367 pages.
 

Dialects of English
American English
Maine culture
New Hampshire culture
Massachusetts culture